Prat Island is an island in the Patagonian Archipelago, Chile. Its area is 762 km².

See also
 List of islands of Chile

External links
 Islands of Chile @ United Nations Environment Programme
 World island information @ WorldIslandInfo.com
 South America Island High Points above 1000 meters

Islands of Aysén Region